The United Nations Educational, Scientific and Cultural Organization (UNESCO) World Heritage Sites are places of importance to cultural or natural heritage as described in the UNESCO World Heritage Convention, established in 1972. Cultural heritage consists of monuments (such as architectural works, monumental sculptures, or inscriptions), groups of buildings, and sites (including archaeological sites). Natural features (consisting of physical and biological formations), geological and physiographical formations (including habitats of threatened species of animals and plants), and natural sites which are important from the point of view of science, conservation, or natural beauty, are defined as natural heritage. Canada accepted the convention on 23 July 1976. , there are 20 World Heritage Sites in Canada, with a further 11 on the tentative list.

Definitions
Site – official designation of the World Heritage Committee. 
Location – the province or territory where the site is located, with geocoordinates. In the case of multinational or multi-regional sites, names are sorted alphabetically after being sorted by country.
Criteria – as defined by the World Heritage Committee.
Area – in hectares and acres, followed by buffer zones if applicable. A value of zero implies that no data has been published by UNESCO.
Year – during which the site was inscribed to the World Heritage Sites list.
Description – brief information about the site, including reasons for inscription.

World Heritage Sites

Tentative List
The Tentative List is an inventory of important heritage and natural sites that a country is considering for inscription on the World Heritage List. The Tentative List can be updated at any time, but inclusion on the list is a prerequisite to being considered for inscription.

Notes

See also
 List of Biosphere Reserves in Canada
 National Historic Sites of Canada

References

 
 
Canada